Reynaldo Guerra Garza (July 7, 1915 – September 14, 2004) was a United States circuit judge of the United States Court of Appeals for the Fifth Circuit. He was the first Mexican-American appointed to a federal court when he was appointed as a United States district judge of the United States District Court for the Southern District of Texas, and would later become the first Mexican-American, as well as the first Latin American, appointed to any circuit of the United States Court of Appeals.

Education and career

Born in Brownsville, Texas, Garza received an Associate of Arts degree from Brownsville Junior College (now Texas Southmost College) in 1935 and a Bachelor of Arts degree from the University of Texas at Austin in 1937. He earned his Bachelor of Laws from the University of Texas School of Law in 1939. He was in private practice of law in Brownsville from 1939 to 1942. He served in the United States Army Air Forces from 1942 to 1945, after which he returned to his law practice in Brownsville, where he remained until 1961.

Federal judicial service

Garza was nominated to the United States District Court for the Southern District of Texas by President John F. Kennedy on March 24, 1961, to a seat vacated by Judge James V. Allred. He was confirmed by the United States Senate on April 13, 1961, and received his commission on April 14, 1961. He served as Chief Judge from 1974 to 1979, when his service on the district court was terminated on August 1, 1979, due to elevation to the Fifth Circuit.

Garza was nominated to the United States Court of Appeals for the Fifth Circuit by President Jimmy Carter on April 30, 1979, to a seat vacated by Judge Homer Thornberry. President Jimmy Carter originally asked Garza to serve as the Attorney General of the United States, which he turned down. Had he accepted and been confirmed by the Senate, Garza would have become the first Hispanic Attorney General of the United States. He was confirmed to the Fifth Circuit by the United States Senate on July 12, 1979, and received his commission on July 13, 1979. Garza assumed senior status on July 7, 1982. He died on September 14, 2004, in his hometown of Brownsville.

See also
List of first minority male lawyers and judges in the United States
List of Hispanic/Latino American jurists

References

External links
 
 The Handbook of Texas Online

|-

|-

|-

1915 births
2004 deaths
20th-century American judges
American judges of Mexican descent
Hispanic and Latino American judges
Judges of the United States Court of Appeals for the Fifth Circuit
Judges of the United States District Court for the Southern District of Texas
People from Brownsville, Texas
United States Army Air Forces personnel of World War II
United States court of appeals judges appointed by Jimmy Carter
United States district court judges appointed by John F. Kennedy
University of Texas School of Law alumni